Caracena is a municipality located in the province of Soria, in the autonomous community of Castile and León, Spain.

There is a Romanesque church, St Peter's. From the point of view of the Catholic Church, it is part of the Diocese of Osma, which in turn is part of the Archdiocese of Burgos.

This village is located in Ruta de la Lana, a historical road from Alicante to Burgos. Caracena is located between Tarancueña and Carrascosa de Abajo.

Situation 

Located on the banks of the Caracena river, limits with:
 From the south with Tarancueña, Cañicera and Valderromán.
 From the west with Hoz de Arriba and Hoz de Abajo.
 From the north with Carrascosa de Abajo.
 From the east with La Perera, Madrúedano and the deserted town of Pozuelo.

The road access takes place by the local road SO-V-1601 who connects La Rasa with Valderromán. This road have connection with Spanish provinces of Soria and Segovia due to the connection between the local road and the SO-135 that starts in Ayllón.

References 

Municipalities in the Province of Soria